Jumièges is a commune in the Seine-Maritime department in the Normandy region in north-western France.

Geography
A ferry service operates here, connecting the commune with the south and west sides of the river.

Heraldry

Demography

Places of interest
 The church of St. Valentin, dating from the eleventh century.
 The ruins of the tenth-century church of St.Pierre (part of the abbey)
 An eighteenth-century chapel.
 Several lesser buildings dating from the eleventh century.

Jumièges Abbey

It is best known as the site of Jumièges Abbey, a typical Norman abbey of the Romanesque period, and the home of the pro-Norman chronicler William of Jumièges who wrote the Gesta Normannorum Ducum about 1070. Ruined in the first quarter of the 19th century, the abbey dates from the 7th century. The church of Notre Dame was consecrated in 1067 in the presence of William the Conqueror

People linked with the commune
 Maurice Leblanc, writer.
 Roger Martin du Gard, writer.

See also
Communes of the Seine-Maritime department

References

External links

History website of Jumièges 

Communes of Seine-Maritime